A by-election was held for the New South Wales Legislative Assembly electorate of Gwydir on 29 June and 20 July 1865 as a result of the Committee on Elections and Qualifications declaring that the seat of Thomas Dangar was vacant because he had an office of profit under the Crown.

Dangar was elected at the 1865 election for the Gwydir in unusual circumstances. Dangar had been appointed the returning officer but was persuaded to stand for the seat, resulting in a delay of a month before the poll could be held. Dangar had a contract with the Government to carry the mail on the Barwon and Namoi rivers and this was held to be an office of profit and thus disqualified him from being a member of the Legislative Assembly.

Dates

Polling places

Polling did not occur at the late added polling places until 20 July.

Result

The election of Thomas Dangar was declared void by the Committee of Elections and Qualifications because he had a contract to carry mail, which was an office of profit under the Crown.It was a comfortable victory for Dangar, with his margin over Single increasing from 53 votes to 81 votes.

See also
Electoral results for the district of Gwydir
List of New South Wales state by-elections

Notes

References

1865 elections in Australia
New South Wales state by-elections
1860s in New South Wales